Khorkhor-e Sofla (also Romanized as Khorkhor-e Soflá; also known as Khor Khor and Khorkhor) is a village in Mahidasht Rural District, Mahidasht District, Kermanshah County, Kermanshah Province, Iran. At the 2006 census, its population was 90, in 18 families.

References 

Populated places in Kermanshah County